Ruslana Oleksiïvna Taran (born 27 October 1970 in Yevpatoria, Ukrainian SSR, Soviet Union) is a Ukrainian sailor.

At the 1996 470-European-Sailing-Championship she won with her Partner Olena Pakholchyk the gold medal.

References

External links
 
 
 

1970 births
Living people
People from Yevpatoria
Olympic sailors of Ukraine
Ukrainian female sailors (sport)
Olympic silver medalists for Ukraine
Olympic bronze medalists for Ukraine
Olympic medalists in sailing
Sailors at the 1996 Summer Olympics – 470
Sailors at the 2000 Summer Olympics – 470
Sailors at the 2004 Summer Olympics – Yngling
Medalists at the 1996 Summer Olympics
Medalists at the 2004 Summer Olympics
Medalists at the 2000 Summer Olympics
ISAF World Sailor of the Year (female)
470 class world champions
World champions in sailing for Ukraine